Iran competed at the 2004 Summer Olympics in Athens, Greece, from 13 to 29 August 2004. The nation has competed at every Summer Olympic games, since its official debut in 1948 with the exception of the 1980 and 1984 Summer Olympics. The National Olympic Committee of the Islamic Republic of Iran sent a total of 38 athletes, 37 men and 1 woman, to compete in 10 sports. Half-lightweight judoka Arash Miresmaeili, who later forfeited his first match against Israel's Ehud Vaks for medical reasons, was the nation's flag bearer in the opening ceremony.

Iran left Athens with a total of six medals (two golds, two silver, and two bronze), finishing twenty-ninth in the overall medal standings. Half of these medals were awarded to the athletes in men's freestyle wrestling. Taekwondo jin Hadi Saei claimed his first ever Olympic title in the men's featherweight division, in addition to his bronze medal from Sydney.

Medalists

|  style="text-align:left; width:72%; vertical-align:top;"|

|  style="text-align:left; width:23%; vertical-align:top;"|

Competitors

Athletics 

Iranian athletes have so far achieved qualifying standards in the following athletics events (up to a maximum of 3 athletes in each event at the 'A' Standard, and 1 at the 'B' Standard).

Key
 Note–Ranks given for track events are within the athlete's heat only
 Q = Qualified for the next round
 q = Qualified for the next round as a fastest loser or, in field events, by position without achieving the qualifying target
 NR = National record
 N/A = Round not applicable for the event
 Bye = Athlete not required to compete in round

Men
Track & road events

Field events

Boxing

Iran has qualified one boxer.

Cycling

Road

Track
Pursuit

Omnium

Judo

Seven Iranian judoka qualified for the 2004 Summer Olympics. Half-lightweight judoka Arash Miresmaeili forfeited his first match against Israel's Ehud Vaks, and accepted his disqualification from the International Judo Federation because a medical condition left him much heavier to fight.

Men

Shooting

Iran has qualified a single shooter.

Women

Swimming

Iran has selected one swimmer under the Universality rule.

Men

Table tennis

Iran has qualified one table tennis player.

Taekwondo

Two Iranian taekwondo jin qualified for the 2004 Summer Olympics.

Weightlifting

Six Iranian weightlifters qualified for the following events.

Wrestling

Key
  - Victory by Fall.
  - Decision by Points - the loser with technical points.
  - Decision by Points - the loser without technical points.

Men's freestyle

Men's Greco-Roman

* Masoud Hashemzadeh was disqualified for protesting after the bronze medal match.

See also
 Iran at the 2002 Asian Games
 Iran at the 2004 Summer Paralympics

References

External links
Official Report of the XXVIII Olympiad
National Olympic Committee of Iran 

Nations at the 2004 Summer Olympics
2004
Summer Olympics